Telosma is a genus of plants in the family Apocynaceae, first described in 1905. It is native to Africa, and Asia.

Species
Accepted species

formerly included
Telosma tomentosa, syn of  Pergularia tomentosa

References

External links

Asclepiadoideae
Apocynaceae genera